Marta Harnecker (1937 - 14 June 2019) was a Chilean journalist, author, psychologist, sociologist, and Marxist intellectual. She studied the analysis of labor movements and acted as an advisor to the government of Cuba, as well as a collaborator with left-wing political movements within Latin America. She was active in the government of Salvador Allende between 1970 and 1973, and provided counsel to Hugo Chavez between 2004 and 2011.

Biography
Marta Harnecker was born in Santiago de Chile in 1937. Her family had Austrian roots. She studied psychology at the Catholic University of Chile in 1962, and did postgraduate studies in Paris with Paul Ricoeur and Louis Althusser. Upon her return to Chile in 1968, she taught Historical Materialism and Political Economy in Sociology at the University of Chile and was director of the political magazine Chile Hoy.

In 1968, Harnecker joined the Socialist Party of Chile. Following the 1973 Chilean coup d'etat against president Salvador Allende, she was forced into exile and lived in Cuba until the death of her first husband, Manuel Piñeiro. While living in Cuba, Harnecker founded the research institute Memoria Popular Latinoamerica (MEPLA) and continued to write. After her time in Cuba, she provided counsel to Venezuelan president Hugo Chavez. In 2004, she married Canadian economist Michael A. Lebowitz.

Harnecker died from cancer on June 14, 2019.

Publications
Harnecker wrote over 80 books, including The Basic Concepts of Historical Materialism and The Left after Seattle. Her more recent books, including Hugo Chavez Frias: Un hombre, un pueblo, Venezuela: Militares junto al pueblo, and Venezuela: una revolución sui generis, reflected her support of the Bolivarian revolution. On 15 August 2014, Harnecker accepted the 2013 Liberator's Prize for Critical Thought for her book A World To Build, which was published in English in January 2015.

Selected works
Harnecker, Marta (2015): A World to Build, Monthly Review Press. .
Harnecker, Marta (2010): Ideas for the Struggle, Socialist Interventions Pamphlet Series.
Harnecker, Marta (1999): Haciendo posible lo imposible: La izquierda en el umbral del siglo XXI, Siglo Veintiuno Editores, 429 p.. 
Harnecker, Marta (1990): América Latina, izquerda y crisis actual: Izquierda y crisis actual, Siglo Veintiuno Editores, 305 p.. 
Harnecker, Marta (1986): La Revolución Social: Lenin y América Latina, Siglo Veintiuno Editores, 307 p..

References

External links
 Biografía de Marta Harnecker en e-libro. (Consultado el 17 August 2008)
 Marta Harnecker en Aporrea – Artículos de Marta Harnecker en Aporrea
 Marta Harnecker en Talcualdigital – Notas biográficas sobre la autora.

1937 births
2019 deaths
Chilean atheists
Chilean Marxists
Chilean sociologists
Chilean women sociologists
Chilean emigrants to Cuba
Chilean people of Austrian descent
Former Roman Catholics
Deaths from cancer in Canada